Artsonje Center is a private art museum in Seoul, Korea, located in Samcheong-dong, a neighborhood adjacent to  known for its numerous art galleries, cafes, restaurants and boutiques. 
Founded in 1998, the museum introduces current and experimental contemporary art to the art world and public with its international exhibitions and educational programs.

The marble multiplex was designed by Jong-Sung Kim and consists of 4 annexes that include exhibition halls, lecture halls, a restaurant, café and artshop. The CineCode Sonje movie theater is a good place to catch offbeat independent films.

See also
List of museums in Seoul
List of museums in South Korea
Korean art
South Korean culture

References

External links
 Official site 

Jongno District
Art museums and galleries in Seoul
1998 establishments in South Korea
Art museums established in 1998